Western Beqaa District is an administrative district in the Beqaa Governorate of the Republic of Lebanon. The capital is Joub Jannine which has a population of 12,000.

Main cities and towns
West Beqaa has a few main cities such as:
 Machghara
 Joub Jannine
 Qaraoun
 Kafraiya
 Kherbet Qanafar
 Dahr El Ahmar

Other towns
Other smaller villages located in West Beqaa
 Aana
 Ain Zebdeh
 Aitanite
 Al Manara
 Al Rafid
 Baaloul
 Bab Maraa
 Chabraqiyet Aammiq
 Chabraqiyet Tabet
 Dakouh
 Deir Ain Jaouzeh
 Deir Tahnich
 Ghazzeh
 Haouch Aammiq
 Haouch al Saalouk
 Haouch El Saiyad
 Haoush al Haremma
 Kamed El Laouz
 Khiara 
 Lala
 Libbaya
 Mansourah District
 Marj, Lebanon
 Mazraat El Chmis
 Meidoun
 Nasrieyh
 Tal El Akhdar
 Tal Zaazaa
 Tal Znoub 
 Rawda
 Saghbine
 Sohmor
 Sultan Yaacoub Tahta
 Sultan Yaacoub Fawqa
Yohmor
 Zilaya

 
Districts of Lebanon